Abdul Haq Azmi (1928 – 30 December 2016) was an Indian Muslim scholar who was a senior professor of hadith at the Darul Uloom Deoband. He was an alumnus of Darul Uloom Mau and Darul Uloom Deoband. His students included Mahmood Madani, Mohammad Najeeb Qasmi and Noor Alam Khalil Amini.

Biography
Abdul Haq Azmi was born in 1928 in Jagdishpur, Azamgarh. He attended local schools and then Madrasa Bayt al-Ulum in Sarai Mir, Azamgarh. He later studied at Darul Uloom Mau up to 7th grade of Arabic and then entered the Darul Uloom Deoband in 1948 and graduated after studying with scholars Hussain Ahmad Madani, Izaz Ali Amrohi and Ibrahim Balyawi. He studied rational sciences with his stepfather Muslim Jaunpuri, who was a disciple of Majid Ali Jaunpuri.

Azmi taught at the Mata'ul Uloom, Banaras for over sixteen years. As a mufti at Darul Uloom Mau for thirteen years, he issued nearly 13,000 rulings. He was later appointed as hadith teacher at the Darul Uloom Deoband in 1982 where he taught Mishkat al-Masabih and the second volume Sahih al-Bukhari. He taught Sahih al-Bukhari in the Darul Uloom Deoband for 34 years. His students included Mohammad Najeeb Qasmi, Mahmood Madani, Noor Alam Khalil Amini and Salman Mansoorpuri.

Azmi died on 30 December 2016 (30 Rabi' al-awwal 1438 AH) and was buried in the Qasmi cemetery of the Darul Uloom Deoband. His funeral prayer was led by Arshad Madani. He is survived by his wife and twelve children. His son Abdul Bar Azmi is Professor of Hadith in Madrasa Bayt al-Ulum Sarai Mir in Azamgarh.

Personal life
Azmi was married to the maternal cousin sister of Muhammad Ayyub Waqif, the father of Indian journalist Rana Ayyub.

References

Citations

Bibliography

 

Sunni Muslim scholars of Islam
Deobandis
1928 births
2016 deaths
Indian Islamic religious leaders
People from Azamgarh district
Darul Uloom Deoband alumni
Academic staff of Darul Uloom Deoband
Burials at Mazar-e-Qasmi